The Philippine Senate Committee on Science and Technology is a standing committee of the Senate of the Philippines.

Jurisdiction 
According to the Rules of the Senate, the committee handles all matters relating to science and technology, including scientific and technological research, development and advancement.

Members, 18th Congress 
Based on the Rules of the Senate, the Senate Committee on Science and Technology has 7 members.

The President Pro Tempore, the Majority Floor Leader, and the Minority Floor Leader are ex officio members.

Here are the members of the committee in the 18th Congress as of September 24, 2020:

Committee secretary: Bernadine B. Mahinay

See also 

 List of Philippine Senate committees

References 

Science